General elections were held in Papua New Guinea between 5 and 26 June 1982. The result was a victory for the Pangu Party, which won 51 of the 109 seats. Voter turnout was 52%.

Campaign
A total of 1,125 candidates contested the election, of which seventeen were women. Only one, Nahau Rooney, was elected. She had been standing for re-election, as had MPs Waliyato Clowes and Josephine Abaijah, who both lost their seats.

Results
Following the elections, several elected MPs changed their party affiliation; the Pangu Party gained ten MPs to hold 61 seats and the National Party gained six MPs to hold 19. The People's Progress Party lost a seat, while the Melanesian Alliance lost two and the United Party lost three. All members of the Diro Independents Group left to join other parties, with no MPs left sitting as independents.

Aftermath
When the newly elected National Parliament met, Michael Somare was elected Prime Minister, defeating John Momis 66–40. Dennis Young was elected Speaker.

References

Elections in Papua New Guinea
Papua
1982 in Papua New Guinea
National Parliament of Papua New Guinea
Election and referendum articles with incomplete results